Marco Polo is a 1962 historical action adventure film directed by Piero Pierotti. The American English-dubbed version includes scenes directed by Hugo Fregonese and a new score by Les Baxter.

Cast 
Rory Calhoun as Marco Polo
Yoko Tani as  Princess Amurroy
Camillo Pilotto as  Grand Khan
Pierre Cressoy as  Cuday
Michael Chow as  Ciu-Lin
Tiny Yong as  Tai-Au (credited as Thien-Huong) 
Franco Ressel

Release
Marco Polo was released in Italy on 21 June 1962. It was released in the United States in August 1962. It was released on 17 May 1963 in France.

Comic book adaption
 Charlton Comics: Marco Polo (1962)

References

Footnotes

Sources

External links

1962 films
1960s historical adventure films
Italian historical adventure films
Films directed by Hugo Fregonese
Films directed by Piero Pierotti
Films set in the 13th century
Films set in the 14th century
Films set in the Yuan dynasty
Films set in China
Films set in Italy
Films adapted into comics
Cultural depictions of Marco Polo
French historical adventure films
1960s French films
1960s Italian films